Yenyenning Lake, also often spelt Yenyening Lakes, and associated lakes are in the upper Avon River catchment area  in Western Australia, and the source of the Avon and Swan River systems.

The names of the lakes and features from the western end of the chain are:

 Causeway Lake
 Johnnie's Lake
 Ski Lake
 Racecourse Lake
 Ossigs Lake
 (feature known as The Neck)
 (unnamed water here)
 Mud Lake
 Rocky Lake
 (unnamed water here)
 Swan Lake
 (feature known as the Channel)

The lakes are part of what are called playa lake chains, and the system is often referred to as an example.

The lakes are found along major ancient drainage lines with a broad drainage floor over a paleochannel and at the meeting point of the zone of
ancient drainage and the zone of rejuvenated drainage. The larger lakes in the system are separated by sandy rises, saline drainage floors and diffuse drainage lines.

Situated in the Wheatbelt region, the lakes have had adjoining land heavily used for agriculture since European settlement in the region.  The lakes occur in three adjoining local government areas, Beverley, Brookton and Quairading. The lakes, which are a wildlife haven, were often referred to as the County Peak lakes and can be seen from the summit of nearby County Peak.

The resultant problems, including salinity issues, have been researched and investigated extensively.  The location west of the lakes, where a dam was created in the early 1900s, is known as the Qualandry Crossing, and has had extensive commentary as to its effectiveness in relation to salinity issues.

Remnant vegetation that surrounds the lakes has been made into a nature reserve.

In the early twentieth century some of the lakes had been identified as either fresh or salty and in the 1970s the lakes were known for duck shooting.

See also

References

Lakes of the Wheatbelt (Western Australia)
Saline lakes of Western Australia